The 2016 Red Bull Air Race of Indianapolis was the seventh round of the 2016 Red Bull Air Race World Championship, the eleventh season of the Red Bull Air Race World Championship. The event took place at the Indianapolis Motor Speedway, in Indianapolis, the United States. German pilot Matthias Dolderer wrapped up his first championship with a round remaining, while Chilean pilot Cristian Bolton made his debut as a replacement for the late Hannes Arch.

Master Class

Qualification

Round of 14

 Pilot received 1 second in penalties

 Pilot received 2 seconds in penalties

 Pilot received 4 seconds in penalties

Round of 8

 Pilot received 3 seconds in penalties

 Pilot received 4 seconds in penalties

Final 4

Challenger Class

Results

Standings after the event

Master Class standings

Challenger Class standings

 Note: Only the top five positions are included for both sets of standings.

References

External links

|- style="text-align:center"
|width="35%"|Previous race:2016 Red Bull Air Race of Lausitz
|width="30%"|Red Bull Air Race2016 season
|width="35%"|Next race:2016 Red Bull Air Race of Las Vegas
|- style="text-align:center"
|width="35%"|Previous race:None
|width="30%"|Red Bull Air Race of Indianapolis
|width="35%"|Next race:2017 Red Bull Air Race of Indianapolis
|- style="text-align:center"

Indianapolis
Motorsport in Indianapolis
2016 in American motorsport
October 2016 sports events in the United States